The Quarterly Census of Employment and Wages (fka ES-202) is the name of the QCEW program.  QCEW is a program of the Bureau of Labor Statistics, U.S. Department of Labor.  ES-202 is the old name and stood for Employment Security Report 202.

External links
Employment and wage profile of the Louisiana and Texas counties affected by Hurricane Ike - Representative article using QCEW data

References

Reports of the Bureau of Labor Statistics